Harry Wilson was an American football coach.  He served as the third head football coach at Buchtel College—now known as the University of Akron—helming the team for one season in 1896 and compiling a record of 0–1.

Head coaching record

References

Year of birth missing
Year of death missing
Akron Zips football coaches